Hacheston is a village and a civil parish in the East Suffolk district, in the English county of Suffolk. The population of the parish at the 2011 census was 345.

It is located on the B1116 road between the towns of Wickham Market and Framlingham. Hacheston has a church and a village hall. Hacheston Halt railway station was closed in 1952.

Glevering Hall is a historic house and estate within the parish which was built in 1794 by Chaloner Arcedeckne, MP. Glevering Hall became a Grade II* listed building on 25 October 1951.

Governance
An electoral ward in the same name exists. This ward stretches north to Bruisyard with a total population taken at the 2011 Census of 1,977.

Notable residents
Chaloner Arcedeckne (c. 1743–1809); MP and Jamaican landowner
Claude Hinscliff (1875–1964); suffragist.
Chinwe Chukwuogo-Roy MBE (1952-2012); visual artist.

Related pages
Glevering Hall
Hacheston Halt railway station

References

External links

 GENUKI page
 Hachfest site

Villages in Suffolk
Civil parishes in Suffolk